is a Japanese actress.  She won the award for best actress at the 23rd  Blue Ribbon Awards for Furueru Shita and at the 29th for Gray Sunset.

Filmography

Film
1974 - Tora-san's Lullaby
1980 - Furueru Shita
1983 - The Catch
1985 - Gray Sunset
1985 - Oar
1989 - Shaso
1991 - Edo Jō Tairan

Television
1978 - Ōgon no Hibi (Kita no mandokoro)
2001 - Hōjō Tokimune (Kakusan-ni)
2009 - Nene: Onna Taikōki (Naka)
2011 - Carnation (Sadako Matsuzaka)
2013 - The Partner (Machi Kinoshita)

Honours
Kinuyo Tanaka Award (1989)
Medal with Purple Ribbon (2003)
Order of the Rising Sun, 4th Class, Gold Rays with Rosette (2013)

References

External links

1942 births
Japanese actresses
Living people
People from Tokyo
Recipients of the Medal with Purple Ribbon
Recipients of the Order of the Rising Sun, 4th class